Ironman Lake Placid (sometimes referred to as Ironman USA) is a  triathlon race owned by the World Triathlon Corporation (WTC) that takes place in Lake Placid, New York and the surrounding Adirondack Mountains.  It is the longest-running Ironman triathlon in North America apart from the Ironman World Championship.  Lake Placid played host to the Winter Olympics in 1932 and again in 1980, and has hosted Ironman Lake Placid every summer since 1999.

In August 2014, the CEO of WTC, Andrew Messick, announced that Ironman Lake Placid would be among the list of North American races that would no longer offer a pro purse prize in 2015. This decision came as a result of the growing Ironman brand, the increased fragmentation of the overall purse prize, and the date of the race in relation to the Ironman World Championship.

Results

References

Triathlon competitions
Sports in Lake Placid, New York
Lake Placid